Adriana Herrera is an author of romantic fiction and erotica. She was born and raised in the Dominican Republic and now resides in New York City.

Herrera's novels overturn conventions of the historical romance genre, such as heterosexuality; for example she has written about openly lesbian relationships in Paris during the 1889 Exposition Universelle.

She was inspired to write because of a lack of romance books with Dominican, Latina, and queer characters. She was influenced by Edith Wharton. Herrera writes "unapologetically happy endings" to her stories.

A story by Herrera was collected in Best Women's Erotica of the Year by Simon & Schuster in 2021.

Awards and honours
Her book American Love Story won a Ripped Bodice Award in 2020.

References

Dominican Republic women writers
Women romantic fiction writers
Living people
Year of birth missing (living people)